The 2014 Currie Cup qualification series was a tournament organised by the South African Rugby Union. It featured seven teams and was played in June and July 2014, with the winner qualifying for the 2014 Currie Cup Premier Division. The remaining six teams played in the 2014 Currie Cup First Division.

Competition

On 13 February 2014, SARU announced that the Currie Cup Premier Division would be expanded from six to eight teams.

The seven teams played each other once over the course of the qualification tournament, either at home or away. Teams received four points for a win and two points for a draw. Bonus points were awarded to teams that scored 4 or more tries in a game, as well as to teams that lost a match by 7 points or less. Teams were ranked by log points, then points difference (points scored less points conceded).

The top team qualified for the 2014 Currie Cup Premier Division, while the other six teams qualified for the 2014 Currie Cup First Division.

Teams

Log

Fixtures and results

The fixture list for the 2014 Currie Cup Premier Division was released on 11 March 2014:

Round One

Round Two

Round Three

Round Four

Round Five

Round Six

Round Seven

Players

Player statistics

The following table contain points which were scored during the 2014 Currie Cup qualification tournament:

See also
 2014 Currie Cup Premier Division
 2014 Currie Cup First Division
 2014 Vodacom Cup

External links

References

2014
2014 Currie Cup